Esteban Villa (born on August 3rd 1930 in Tulare California and died on May 16th 2022 in Sacramento Califas - Aztlan), was an American muralist, artist, and Chicano activist. A professor emeritus at California State University, Sacramento, his teaching career began in 1962 at the high school level and includes assignments at Washington State University, D–Q University, University of California, Davis, and numerous lecture and slide presentations, art exhibits and mural projects at universities mainly in California and surrounding states. He has served as an art consultant to schools and organizations including Centro de Artistas Chicanos, and has done art programs in the prison system. He is a founding member of the Royal Chicano Air Force, a collective of artists, professors and students, which was formed amid the Chicano Movimiento's push for social and political rights.

In addition, Villa has been involved in the production of the KVIE-TV documentary Pilots of Aztlán, a film about the Royal Chicano Air Force, which he co-founded.  This film, in which he appears along with other RCAF members, was aired on KVIE in January, 1995. He exhibited a major survey of his paintings and related works at the Galeria Posada in February through March, 1995, titled The Art of Esteban Villa, and was in a group art show at Encina Art Gallery during Feb/March, 1995.

References

1930 births
Living people
American artists of Mexican descent
Artists from Sacramento, California